Ponerorchis bidupensis is a species of flowering plant in the family Orchidaceae, native to southern Vietnam.

Taxonomy
The species was first described in 1999 by Leonid Averyanov, as Hemipilia bidupensis. In 2010, he transferred it to Amitostigma. A molecular phylogenetic study in 2014 found that species of Neottianthe, Amitostigma and Ponerorchis were mixed together in a single clade, making none of the three genera monophyletic as then circumscribed. Neottianthe and Amitostigma were subsumed into Ponerorchis, with this species becoming Ponerorchis bidupensis.

References

bidupensis
Orchids of Vietnam
Plants described in 1999